Paoli Township is one of ten townships in Orange County, Indiana, United States. As of the 2010 census, its population was 6,031 and it contained 2,679 housing units.

History
Thomas Elwood Lindley House and Newberry Friends Meeting House are listed on the National Register of Historic Places.

Geography

Cities, towns, villages
 Paoli

Unincorporated towns
 Chambersburg at 
 Lost River at 
 Stampers Creek at 
 Syria at 
 Turleys at 
 Woodlawn Grove at 
(This list is based on USGS data and may include former settlements.)

Cemeteries
The township contains these four cemeteries: Lewis, Paoli Community, Scott and Springer.

Major highways
  U.S. Route 150
  Indiana State Road 37
  Indiana State Road 56

Airports and landing strips
 Paoli Municipal Airport

Education
 Paoli Community School Corporation
 Throop Elementary School (Grades K-6)
 Paoli Junior Senior High School (Grades 7-12)

Paoli Township residents may obtain a free library card from the Paoli Public Library in the Town of Paoli.

Political districts
 Indiana's 9th congressional district
 State House District 62
 State Senate District 44

References
 
 United States Census Bureau 2008 TIGER/Line Shapefiles
 IndianaMap

External links
 Indiana Township Association
 United Township Association of Indiana
 City-Data.com page for Paoli Township

Townships in Orange County, Indiana
Townships in Indiana